The following is a list of notable alumni, faculty and affiliates that are associated with Brock University in St.Catharines, Ontario, Canada.

Notable Brock alumni

Academic leaders
Lorraine Janzen Kooistra (BA) — professor of English at Toronto Metropolitan University and an elected fellow of the Royal Society of Canada
Mariana Valverde (BA) — Professor of Criminology at the University of Toronto and former Director of the University of Toronto's Centre for Criminology & Sociolegal Studies
Lee Ward — Alpha Sigma Nu Distinguished Professor of Political Studies at the University of Regina
Samir Trabelsi (professor) — CPA Ontario Distinguished Scholar and Professor of Governance and Accounting at Goodman School of Business
Paul Pounder (professor) (BBA, 1998) — Professor of Entrepreneurship and Director of Graduate Programs - Won an award for Outstanding Paper in the 2022 Emerald Literati Awards at St. George's University Grenada

Actors, film, and media
Rick Campanelli (BPhEd, 1994) — former host of MuchMusic and reporter for ET Canada
Jared Pelletier — film director
Matthew Santoro (MA, 2010) — YouTube personality

Athletics and sports
Ray Barkwill (BSc Phys.Geog 2010) — Canadian national rugby team
Stan Butler (Masters Ed. 1988) Ontario Hockey League coach, North Bay Battalion
Kyle Dubas - (BSM 2009) General Manager of the Toronto Maple Leafs
Dennis Hull — retired National Hockey League player
Dan MacKenzie (B.Ed. 1995) Canadian sports and marketing executive
Sean Pierson — Canadian National Team wrestler; professional mixed martial artist, Welterweight in the UFC
Tonya Verbeek (BRLS, 2000; BEd, 2003; Med, 2006) — 2004 Olympics silver medalist (wrestling), 2008 Olympics bronze medalist (wrestling)
Shawn Williams — six-time National Lacrosse League All-Star

Business leaders and entrepreneurs

Asad Jalib (BBA, 2021) — Vice President, Operations of Brokrete Inc.
Denis Dyack (BPhEd, 1990; BSc 1990) — President of Silicon Knights Inc.
 Vince Molinaro (BA, 1985) — leadership consultant, public speaker, and New York Times bestselling author
Denver Russell (BA, 2022) — YouTuber, Top Ranked Fall Guys Player

Literature and the arts
Daniel Adair — musician, Nickelback
 J.M. Frey (BA, 2005) — award-winning science fiction and fantasy writer
Marc Jordan — musician
Peter McLaren — author
Yuri Rubinsky (BA, 1972) — writer and publisher
Kari-Lynn Winters (BA, 1992) — children's author, professor of education

Political leaders
Malcolm Allen — Member of the House of Commons of Canada
Rick Dykstra (BA, 1997) — Member of the House of Commons of Canada
Brian McMullan — Mayor of St. Catharines
Kyle Rae — City of Toronto's first gay councillor
Karen Kraft Sloan (BAdmin, 1982) — former Member of the House of Commons of Canada
Sean O'Sullivan - former Progressive Conservative Member of Parliament and Roman Catholic priest

Notable Brock faculty members and affiliates
Charles Burton — Distinguished Sinologist, policy advisor and diplomat
Kim Campbell (LL.D, 1998) — first female Prime Minister of Canada
Buzz Hargrove (LL.D, 1998) — President, Canadian Auto Workers trade union
Paul House (LL.D, 2008) — President, CEO, TDL Corp. (Tim Hortons)
Liette Vasseur  — Biologist, President of the Canadian Commission for UNESCO

Presidents

Dr. James Alexander Gibson (1965–1973)
Dr. Alan Earp (1973–1988)
Dr. Terrence White (1988–1997)
Dr. David W. Atkinson (1997–2005)
Dr. Jack N. Lightstone (2007–2016)
Dr. Gervan Fearon (2017–present)

Chancellors

Richard L. Hearn (1967–1969)
Charles Sankey (1969–1974) 
Cecil Shaver (1974–1980) 
Ralph S. Misener (1980–1985) 
Robert S. K. Welch (1985–2000) 
Raymond Moriyama (2001–2007)
Ned Goodman (2007–2015)
Shirley Cheechoo (2015–2020)
Hilary Pearson (2020–Present)

References

Top 30 After 30. Brock University Alumni Association. Retrieved from: http://www.brocku.ca/webnews/displaystory.phtml?TEMPLATE=template.html&sid=1576
Brock University Timeline. James A. Gibson Library, Brock University. Retrieved from:http://www.library.brocku.ca/spcl/timeline/index.htm

Brock University
Brock University
Brock University